Henry Boyle (22 April 1924 – 9 April 2012) was a Scottish footballer who played as a full back for Southport and Rochdale. He was also on the reserve teams of Middlesbrough and Manchester United. He was manager of Marine in the 1970s.

Boyle died in Southport on 9 April 2012, at the age of 88.

References

1924 births
2012 deaths
Middlesbrough F.C. players
Manchester United F.C. players
Southport F.C. players
Rochdale A.F.C. players
South Bank St Peters F.C. players
Billingham Synthonia F.C. players
Murton A.F.C. players
Bangor City F.C. players
Runcorn F.C. Halton players
Altrincham F.C. players
Wigan Rovers F.C. players
People from Possilpark
Footballers from Glasgow
Scottish footballers
Association football fullbacks